

Collegiate chapters
This is the list of chapters of the National Panhellenic Conference sorority Chi Omega. Active chapters are noted in bold, inactive chapters are noted in italics and grey rows, and unassigned chapter names are in plain text. Unless otherwise noted, citations are from the national Chi Omega chapter list or the online Baird's Archive. Dormant schools are similarly noted in italics.

Naming convention
Chi Omega's first series chapters (single-letter) are named for 24 of the Greek letters and assigned in an order customized to Chi Omega, approximating a reverse alphabetical order.  The Omega chapter is reserved as a memorial designation, and subsequent chapters do not use the letter Omega in their name.  Each subsequent series, (Alpha Alpha series, Alpha Beta series, where the second letter marks the name of the series) follow generally that same naming convention established with the first series, thus beginning with a Psi chapter and naming its chapters through Alpha.  For purposes of this table, where a single chapter name was unused in a series, it is shown in its assumed place within that series, marked as unassigned.  The Alpha Epsilon series was only partly used, this occurring in the early 1950s, with 17 of those names unused (including Omega).  The Alpha Eta series was not used, with all 24 names unassigned (including Omega). The Alpha Iota series was not used, likewise with all 24 names unassigned (including Omega).  The most recent chapter names assigned have been in the Alpha Mu series. 

Since Chi Omega's founding, eight chapter names have been reassigned, with the last of these occurring in 1943.

Notes

References

External links 
 Chi Omega official site

Chi Omega
chapters